Callitris pancheri is a plant species of the family Cupressaceae. It is endemic to New Caledonia, where it occurs in small, scattered population along rivers. It used to be placed in its own genus Neocallitropsis but molecular phylogenetic analysis indicated that it was nested within Callitris.

References

pancheri
Endemic flora of New Caledonia
Trees of New Caledonia
Vulnerable plants
Taxobox binomials not recognized by IUCN
Taxa named by Élie-Abel Carrière